This is a list of unofficial members of the Legislative Council in the colonial period from restoration of the Council after the return of the British rule in 1946 up to the official members were replaced by indirect elected member in 1985. There were a maximum of 23 Unofficial Members from 1976 to 1983, 29 Unofficial Members from 1983 to 1984 and 32 Unofficial Members from 1984 to 1985.

Change in composition

Source

List of Unofficial Members of the Legislative Council

References